Hur Nam-sik (born March 14, 1949 in Uiryeong, Gyeongsangnam-do, South Korea) was the 33rd, 34th, 35th mayor of Busan city.

Careers

  The 19th Higher Civil Service Examination (1976)
  Director of Transportation Planning, Busan Metropolitan City
  Director of Personnel Management, Busan Metropolitan City
  Planning Director of Busan Metropolitan City (1994)
  Mayor of Yeongdo-gu, Busan
  Director-General of Preparatory Bureau for the Asian Games, Busan Metropolitan City
  Director-General of Home Affairs, Busan Metropolitan City
  Director of Waterworks, Busan Metropolitan City (1995)
  Chief of Busan Metropolitan Council Bureau
  Director of Planning and Management, Busan Metropolitan City (Nov,.2000 - Jan.,.2003)
  Deputy Mayor for Political Affairs of Busan City (2003)
  Mayor of Busan Metropolitan City (June, 2004 - June 2014)
  President of Governors Association of Korea (October, 2008)

References

Living people
1949 births
Mayors of Busan
Gimhae Heo clan